Events from the year 1694 in Ireland.

Incumbent
Monarch: William III and Mary II (until 28 December)

Events
French Huguenot refugees settle in Portarlington.
December 28 – with the death of Queen Mary II, William III becomes sole monarch.

Arts and literature
January 9 – Henry Purcell's ode Great Parent, Hail! and John Blow's anthem I Beheld, and Lo! are performed in Christ Church Cathedral, Dublin, at a concert to mark the centenary of Trinity College.
c. October 25 – Jonathan Swift is appointed to the Church of Ireland prebend of Kilroot, near Carrickfergus in County Antrim (until 1696).

Births

July 16 – Marcus Beresford, 1st Earl of Tyrone, politician (d. 1763)
August 8 – Francis Hutcheson, theologian and philosopher (d. 1746)
November 5 – Sir Robert Blackwood, 1st Baronet (d. 1774)
Michael Cuffe, politician (d. 1744)
Andrew Donlevy, Roman Catholic priest.
William FitzMaurice, 2nd Earl of Kerry, peer and military officer (d. 1747)
Warden Flood, Lord Chief Justice of Ireland (d. 1764)
Robert Parkinson, lawyer and politician (d. 1761)

Deaths

July 1 – Justin McCarthy, Viscount Mountcashel, Jacobite general.
December 28 – Mary II of England, Queen regnant (b. 1662)
c. December – Patrick Adair, Ulster Scots Presbyterian minister (b. c. 1625)
Valentine Browne, 1st Viscount Kenmare, peer (b. 1638)
Probable date – Sir Brian O'Neill, 2nd Baronet, judge and landowner.

References

 
Years of the 17th century in Ireland
1690s in Ireland
Ireland